The Office Picnic is a 1972 Australian comedy film directed by Tom Cowan. It was entered into the 8th Moscow International Film Festival.

Plot summary
A group of public servants go on an annual picnic. Two of them, Peter and Elly, disappear.

Cast
John Wood as Clyde
Kate Fitzpatrick as Mara
Philip Deamer as Peter
Gaye Steele as Elly
Ben Gabriel as Mr Johnson
Max Cullen as Jim O'Casey
Anne Tait
Francis Flannigan
Bryon Kennedy
Graham Richards

Production
Cowan got the idea to make the film while walking through the bush during shooting of a documentary in the Victorian countryside. He says he was also influenced by the novels of Patrick White and the films of Antonioni.

The film was shot on 35mm using a budget in part funded by the Experimental Film and Television Fund. It started in January 1972 but the money ran out during filming and there was a hiatus until filming resumed in April. The shoot took fifteen days in all.

Release
The film was successfully previewed at Toorak and for a time it looked as though it would be distributed by British Empire Films but in the end most commercial screenings were arranged by the director.

References

External links
 
The Office Picnic at Oz Movies

1972 films
1972 comedy films
Australian comedy films
Picnic films
Films about missing people
1970s English-language films
1970s Australian films